A mangala sutra, or thaali (ISO: tāḷi), is a necklace that the groom ties around the bride's neck in the Indian subcontinent, in a ceremony called ) within a Hindu wedding. The necklace serves as a visual marker of status as a married Hindu woman.  

Mangala sutra's origin dates back to the 6th Century AD as a single yellow thread was tied around the bride for protection from other men and evil spirits. Mangala sutra is a social practice widespread in India, Sri Lanka, and Nepal. The term Mangala sutra in Sanskrit means holy thread.

Overview
Mangala sutra literally means "an auspicious thread" which is knotted around the bride's neck. It is usually a necklace with black beads strung from a black or yellow thread prepared with turmeric. Sometimes gold, white or red beads are also added to the Mangala sutra, depending on regional variation. It is a symbol of marriage worn by women. The idea of sacred thread existed for centuries, even going back to the Sangam period. But the nature of these auspicious threads has evolved over time and varies widely according to various communities. Non-Hindu religious groups such as Syrian Christians also wear mangal sutra, but with a cross on it. There are many communities in India, among whom the mangal sutra seems to be absent, and other forms of marital tokens have taken their place. For example, in large parts of North India, the toe ring and glass bangles indicate the marital status of a woman.

Historian of Indian jewellery, Dr. Usha Balakrishnan explains that the practice of ritualistically adorning the bride with a mangal sutra to solemnise marriage, is a modern concept, made possible due to marketing strategies of businesses. She also says that,“There was no concept in ancient India of a marriage being solemnised through a mangal sutra as we know of it today with diamonds, pendants and the like,”The concept of mangal sutra has evolved over centuries, and has become an integral part of marriages among several Indian communities.

Significance
The significance of the mangala sutra was re-iterated by Adi Shankara in his famous book Soundarya Lahari. According to Hindu tradition, the mangala sutra is worn for the long life of the husband. As told by religious customs and social expectations, married women should wear mangala sutra throughout their life as it is believed that the practice enhances the well-being of her husband. Bridal jewellery in ancient times also worked as a financial security against old age and widowhood, as women did not have any property rights.

In different languages
It is called thaali or maangalyam in  Tamil, nuptial chain in English, thella  in Sinhala, mongolsutro (মঙ্গলসূত্র) in Bengali, mangal sutra in Marathi, mangalyasutra, thaali in Kannada, and thaali, maangalyamu, mangalasutramu or pustelu in Telugu, thaali in Malayalam, Mangalasutra (ମଙ୍ଗଳସୂତ୍ର) in Odia,  Konkani people (Goans, Mangaloreans, East Indians and others, including  Hindus ) wear three necklaces around their necks, referred to as dhaaremani or muhurtmani (big golden bead), mangalasutra with one or two gold discs and kasithaali with gold and coral beads. In Andhra Pradesh and Telangana regions, the two coin-sized gold discs are separated by 2-3 beads of different kinds. By tradition, one disc comes from the bride's family and another from the groom's side.

Designs
Mangala sutras are made in a variety of designs. The common ones are the Lakshmi thaali worn by the Telugus of Telangana and Andhra Pradesh, which contain images of Lakshmi, the goddess of auspiciousness, ela thaali or minnu worn by the Malayalees of Kerala, and the Kumbha thaali worn by the Tamils of the Kshatriya caste in Tamil Nadu. The design is chosen by the groom's family according to prevalent customs. Gujaratis and Marwaris from Rajasthan often use a diamond pendant in a gold chain which is merely ornamental in nature and is not a substitute to the mangala sutra in the traditional sense. Marathis of Maharashtra wear a pendant of two vati ornaments. The mangala sutra of the Kannadigas of Karnataka is similar to that of the Marathis, except that it usually has two vatis. Nowadays many fashion-conscious families opt for lighter versions, with a single vati or a more contemporary style.

Gallery

See also
Hindu wedding
Sindoor
Karva Chauth
Pativrata

References

Sources
"An Ornament of Beauty," by Ganesh Joshi published in Woman's Era, January 2007.

Indian wedding
Indian culture
Necklaces
Jewellery of India
Culture of Andhra Pradesh